Laluna is a music radio station that is licensed to Klaipėda, Lithuania.

History 
The station began broadcasting on August 25, 1995 and now it is the most popular radio station in Klaipėda.

Programs 
 Lalunos Top 40
 Gyventi gera
 Ant Bangos
 Ko širdelė geidžia
 Geriausi vakarai
 Savaitgalio Žadintuvas
 Naktis Su Laluna

External links

Radio stations in Lithuania
1995 establishments in Lithuania
Mass media in Klaipėda